Arthur Kristiansen (18 July 1923 – 7 July 2001) was a Norwegian ice hockey player, born in Oslo, Norway. He played for the Norwegian national ice hockey team, and  participated at the Winter Olympics in 1952, where the Norwegian team placed 9th.

References

External links

1923 births
2001 deaths
Norwegian ice hockey players
Olympic ice hockey players of Norway
Ice hockey players at the 1952 Winter Olympics
Ice hockey people from Oslo